The Opponent may refer to: 
 The Opponent (1988 film), a 1988 film starring Daniel Greene
 The Opponent (2000 film), a 2000 film starring Erika Eleniak